Taoranting Subdistrict is a subdistrict on the southeast part of Xicheng District, Beijing, China. As of 2020, its total population is 42,231.

This subdistrict got its name from the Taoranting Park that is located in the subdistrict.

History

Administrative Division 
As of 2021, there are a total of 10 communities under the subdistrict. They are listed on the table below:

Landmark 

 Taoranting Park
 Huguang Guild Hall

References 

Xicheng District
Subdistricts of Beijing